Chris Watts (born 3 July 1967) is an English cricket umpire. He has stood in domestic matches in the Marylebone Cricket Club University Matches, Royal London One-Day Cup and T20 Blast. He also stood in domestic match in County Championship.

He stood in tour List A match in between Leicestershire and New Zealand, and tour First-class match in between Northamptonshire and Australia in 2015.

He has stood as an umpire in international matches featuring the England women's cricket team, during India women tour of England in 2021.

References

External links
 
 

1967 births
Living people
English cricket umpires
Sportspeople from Norfolk